MV Borthwick may refer to:

 MV Borthwick – a 1940 coaster launched as MV Empire Gat
 MV Borthwick – a 1977 LPG Tanker

Ship names